Henry Horrocks Slater (1851–26 November 1934) was an English  clergyman and a naturalist who studied ornithology, entomology, and botany.

Early life and clerical career 
Slater was born in Stanhope, County Durham, the son of the priest Henry Slater and his wife Mary Sarah Horrocks. He was matriculated at St Catharine's College, Cambridge in 1870, and graduated as a Bachelor of Arts in 1880 (made Master of Arts in 1887). In 1879 he was ordained a deacon in Ripon, West Riding of Yorkshire. In 1881 he was ordained as a priest. From 1879 to 1882 he was chaplain in Sharow, near Ripon, and from 1882 to 1883 he was chaplain in Chearsley, Buckinghamshire. From 1883 to 1893 he was parish priest in Irchester. From 1893 to 1906 he was the parish priest of Thornhaugh, Nottinghamshire. He retired at Bishops Lydeard and died there in 1934.

Natural history work 
 
In 1874 he accompanied the botanist Isaac Bayley Balfour and George Gulliver aboard HMS Shearwater on an expedition to observe the transit of Venus on Rodrigues. In addition to studies of the flora and fauna, Slater excavated the subfossil bones of extinct birds, including the Rodrigues solitaire (Pezophaps solitaria) and Rodrigues starling (Necropsar rodericanus). His records were used by the zoologists Albert Günther and Alfred Newton to write the first scientific description of the Rodrigues starling in 1879. During a stay in Mauritius in 1875 he and George Gulliver explored the flora, the herpetofauna, and the aquatic avifauna. In 1885 he traveled with Thomas Carter to Iceland. Based partly on his work there, he wrote the Manual of the Birds of Iceland, published in 1901. In 1897 Slater described the short-tailed parrotbill (Paradoxornis davidianus) and the sulphur-breasted warbler (Phylloscopus ricketti). Together with William Bernhardt Tegetmeier and Frederick William Frohawk, he wrote the fifth volume of British Birds With Their Nests and Eggs (1898). In 1877 Slater was elected a Fellow of the Zoological Society of London (FZS). He was also a member of the British Ornithologists' Union.

Bibliography

Notes

References

External links
 

1851 births
1934 deaths
English naturalists
English ornithologists
People from Stanhope, County Durham
19th-century English Anglican priests
20th-century English Anglican priests
Fellows of the Zoological Society of London
Alumni of St Catharine's College, Cambridge
People from Irchester
People from Northamptonshire (before 1974)